In linear algebra, skew-Hamiltonian matrices are special matrices which correspond to skew-symmetric bilinear forms on a symplectic vector space.

Let V be a vector space, equipped with a symplectic form . Such a space must be even-dimensional. A linear map  is called a skew-Hamiltonian operator with respect to  if the form   is skew-symmetric.

Then a linear operator is skew-Hamiltonian with respect to  if and only if its matrix A satisfies , where J is the skew-symmetric matrix

and In is the  identity matrix. Such matrices are called skew-Hamiltonian.

The square of a Hamiltonian matrix is skew-Hamiltonian. The converse is also true: every skew-Hamiltonian matrix can be obtained as the square of a Hamiltonian matrix.

Notes

Matrices
Linear algebra